In telecommunication, the term fade margin (fading margin) has the following meanings:

A design allowance that provides for sufficient system gain or sensitivity to accommodate expected fading, for the purpose of ensuring that the required quality of service is maintained.
The amount by which a received signal level may be reduced without causing system performance to fall below a specified threshold value. It is mainly used to describe a communication system such as satellite, for example a system like globalstar operates at 25-35 dB Fade margin.

See also
 Multipath propagation
 Link Budget

References

Radio frequency propagation fading

Attila Hilt, "Availability and Fade Margin Calculations for 5G Microwave and Millimeter-Wave Anyhaul Links", Applied Sciences, 2019, 9(23), 5240; https://doi.org/10.3390/app9235240.,
Trevor Manning, "Microwave Radio Transmission Design Guide", 2nd edition; Artech House: London, UK, 2009.